Logansport/ Cass County Airport  is a public airport  south of Logansport, in Cass County, Indiana. The airport was founded in November 1959.

As of 2015, the airport has been the home of Air Indiana Skydiving Center.

References

External links 

 

Airports in Indiana
Transportation buildings and structures in Cass County, Indiana